Loretta M. Ucelli is a senior communications and management advisor who served as Assistant to the President and Director of White House Communications during the Presidency of Bill Clinton from 1999 – 2001.

Early life
Ucelli began her career as the Anchor and News Director of WCLG-FM Radio in Morgantown, West Virginia and later as News Editor for KDKA Radio in Pittsburgh, Pennsylvania. She received a Bachelor of Science in Journalism in 1976 from West Virginia University. She has appeared as a communications expert on television and in print, including as a guest contributor on CNBC. Ucelli lives in New York City.

Biography
While at the White House, Ucelli advised President Clinton on media and messaging strategies for issues including the economy, environment, healthcare, education and foreign policy. She was also responsible for initiating the use of the internet in President Clinton’s communication strategy, including the incorporation of “web side” chats. Prior to the White House, Ucelli worked as associate administrator for the United States Environmental Protection Agency (EPA), where she led efforts to transform the EPA’s overall communications strategy. She also served as a senior ranking communications executive for the American Federation of Government Employees and the National Association of Broadcasters (NAB).

Since serving in the Clinton administration, she has held executive vice presidential roles within global corporations and educational institutions including Columbia University and Pfizer. An alumnus of West Virginia University (WVU) – where Ucelli won the Distinguished Alumni Award in 2002 – she is also a member of the WVU School of Journalism’s Professional in Residence program, where Ucelli works with students and faculty on issues such as the future of journalism.

Today she serves as a member of Baruch College's MA in Corporate Communications Advisory Board; on the Executive Committee of the Public Relations Society of America's New York Chapter; and as a senior advisor to public relations firm Gutenberg Communications. She is also currently Vice President of Communications and Public Affairs at the Peter G. Peterson Foundation

References

External links
 Ucelli's LinkedIn Profile

1954 births
Columbia University people
Living people
West Virginia University alumni
People of the United States Environmental Protection Agency
White House Communications Directors
Clinton administration personnel
Pfizer people